A squitten is a cat with a genetic deformity which causes a partial formation or complete absence of the radius bone making it resemble a squirrel. These cats should be kept indoors and seen to by specialist veterinarians, as long term management of the condition is essential for quality of life in these cats.  It is an example of a cat body type genetic mutation. The word is a portmanteau of squirrel and kitten.

The term kangaroo cat is also, rarely, used; this derives from a 1953 specimen known as the Stalingrad Kangaroo Cat.

Characteristics

The term squitten is generally used to refer to cats with the condition radial hypoplasia (underdeveloped radius bones) or foreleg micromelia (small forelegs) and related conditions known as radial aplasia (absent radius bones), radial agenesis (failure of radius bones to form) that produces stunted forelegs. The mutation sometimes occurs in the random-breeding population, particularly in inbred populations where recessive genes may be exhibited. Such cats have also been called twisty cats; In the late 1990s, several were deliberately bred at Karma Farms, a horse farm and cattery in Marshall, Texas, resulting in a public outcry against the operators of the farm.

Radial hypoplasia is related to one form of polydactyly, sometimes called patty feet or hamburger feet by cat lovers to distinguish them from thumb cat polydactyls. Ordinary mitten cat polydactyls are not affected.

Cats with radial hypoplasia or similar mutations often sit on their rump with their forelegs unable to touch the floor; this gives them a resemblance to a squirrel or kangaroo.  This raises special care considerations for owners of affected cats. Kittens may be unable to knead effectively with their short forelegs; kneading is required to stimulate milk flow in the mother. The short or twisted forelegs cause mobility problems and such cats may adapt by using their hindlegs in a hopping gait.

A corresponding condition affecting the hind legs is called femoral hypoplasia and has only been reported three times in cats.

Typical characteristics of a squitten are short forelegs, with a short radius and ulna which may be twisted or absent, extra front toes, and normal-length hind legs.

See also
 Cabbit - portmanteau of cat and rabbit
 Chimera
 Dwarf cats
 Munchkin—a cat breed with short legs
 Polydactyl cat

References

Cat breeds and types with short legs
Domesticated animal genetics